Hydroxyurea dermopathy is caused by chronic use of hydroxyurea  for chronic myelogenous leukemia, thrombocytosis, or psoriasis, and presents with skin lesions characteristic of dermatomyositis.

See also
Skin lesion
 List of cutaneous conditions

References

External links 

 

Drug eruptions